The 1948 Masters Tournament was the 12th Masters Tournament, held April 8–11 at Augusta National Golf Club in Augusta, Georgia.

Claude Harmon shot a record-tying 279 (−9) and finished five strokes ahead of runner-up Cary Middlecoff, a future champion in 1955. The Sunday gallery in 1948 was estimated at 10,000 spectators, and the tournament purse was $10,000. Harmon won $2,500 and his four-round score tied the record set by Ralph Guldahl in 1939. Primarily a club professional, it was Harmon's first tour victory.

This was the final appearance as a player in the Masters for host Bobby Jones, then age 46. It was also the last Masters that did not immediately present the iconic green jacket to the winner. The nine winners of the first twelve tournaments received their green jackets in 1949.

The five-stroke victory margin was matched by Ben Hogan in 1953; the record was raised to seven in 1955 by Cary Middlecoff, nine in 1965 by Jack Nicklaus, and twelve by Tiger Woods in 1997.

Field
1. Masters champions
Jimmy Demaret (7,9), Ralph Guldahl (2), Herman Keiser (7,9), Byron Nelson (2,6,7,9), Henry Picard (6,9), Gene Sarazen (2,4,6), Horton Smith (9), Craig Wood (2)

2. U.S. Open champions
Billy Burke, Johnny Farrell, Bobby Jones (3,4,5), Lawson Little (3,5,9), Lloyd Mangrum (7,9,10,12), Lew Worsham (7,10,12)

3. U.S. Amateur champions
Dick Chapman (8,9,a), Skee Riegel (8,11,a)

4. British Open champions
Denny Shute (6,9), Sam Snead (6,7,9,10)

5. British Amateur champions

6. PGA champions
Jim Ferrier (9,10,12), Vic Ghezzi (9,10,12), Bob Hamilton, Ben Hogan (7,9,10)

7. Members of the U.S. 1947 Ryder Cup team
Herman Barron (9), Dutch Harrison (10)

Ed Oliver (9,10) did not play.

8. Members of the U.S. 1947 Walker Cup team
George Hamer (a), Fred Kammer (a), Bud Ward (3,10,11,a)

Ted Bishop (3,a), Smiley Quick (a), Frank Stranahan (9,10,a) and Willie Turnesa (3,5,a) did not play.

9. Top 24 players and ties from the 1947 Masters Tournament
Johnny Bulla, Fred Haas, Chandler Harper, Jug McSpaden, Dick Metz (10), Johnny Palmer (10), Toney Penna, Ellsworth Vines

10. Top 24 players and ties from the 1947 U.S. Open
Sammy Byrd, Ed Furgol, Leland Gibson (12), Chick Harbert (12), Claude Harmon, Joe Kirkwood Sr., Gene Kunes, Jim McHale Jr. (a), Bill Nary, Al Smith, Harry Todd

George Payton and Paul Runyan did not play.

11. 1947 U.S. Amateur quarter-finalists
Bob Rosburg (a), Jack Selby (a), Felice Torza, Harvie Ward (a)

Johnny Dawson (a) and Frank Strafaci (a) did not play.

12. 1947 PGA Championship quarter-finalists
Art Bell, Ky Laffoon

13. One amateur, not already qualified, selected by a ballot of ex-U.S. Amateur champions
Chuck Kocsis (a) did not play

14. One professional, not already qualified, selected by a ballot of ex-U.S. Open champions
Skip Alexander

15. Two players, not already qualified, with the best scoring average in the winter part of the 1948 PGA Tour
Cary Middlecoff

Clayton Heafner did not play.

16 Winner of the 1948 Inter-service Invitational tournament
Played after the Masters, the winner receiving entry to the 1949 event.

17 Home club professional
Ed Dudley

18. Foreign invitations
Henry Cotton (4), Bobby Locke (9,10)

Round summaries

First round
Thursday, April 8, 1948

Source:

Second round
Friday, April 9, 1948

Source:

Third round
Saturday, April 10, 1948

Source:

Final round
Sunday, April 11, 1948

Final leaderboard

Sources:

Scorecard

Cumulative tournament scores, relative to par

References

External links
Masters.com – past winners and results
Augusta.com – 1948 Masters leaderboard and scorecards

1948
1948 in golf
1948 in American sports
1948 in sports in Georgia (U.S. state)
April 1948 sports events in the United States